CNBC-e was a Turkish free-to-air television channel operated in Turkey by CNBC Europe and the NTV Group. The channel shares its name with a co-owned magazine about CNBC-e. The economy-related morning and afternoon programmes of CNBC-e are in Turkish and are dedicated mainly to the global and Turkish financial markets such as the Istanbul Stock Exchange, while the evening programmes are mostly American TV series, films, talk shows and animations in English (with Turkish subtitles).

The channel also produces a weekly 15-minute programme in English, Business Turkey, which airs at weekends on CNBC Europe and is one of the few CNBC programmes still using the channel's 2000 on-air identity, though only for its opening titles.

The schedule contains education, culture, drama, entertainment, music and sports programs and news with commercial breaks.

The channel was sold to Discovery Communications and replaced with TLC Türkiye on 6 November 2015.

Turkish broadcasting 
The channel's business day programmes used the same on-air look like CNBC Europe.

During the day, the channel operated as the Turkish-language version of CNBC Europe. The channel broadcast five main business day shows which are corresponding programmes of CNBC Europe, but were dedicated mainly to the Turkish financial markets:
 Squawk Box Europe: Geri Sayım
 Morning Exchange: Piyasa Ekranı
 Power Lunch Europe: Finans Cafe
 Street Signs: Kapanışa Doğru
 European Closing Bell: Son Baskı

Also it aired a business day show from BBC Turkish.

All series 

 24
 The 4400
 A Young Doctor's Notebook
 According To Jim 
 The Adventures of Jimmy Neutron: Boy Genius
 All Grown Up!
 Ally McBeal
 Aliens in America
 Angel
 The Angry Beavers
 Arrested Development
 As If 
 As Told By Ginger
 Avatar: The Last Airbender
 Back at the Barnyard
 Battlestar Galactica
 Beavis and Butthead
 Being Human
 The Big Bang Theory
 Black Sails
 Boomtown
 Boston Public
 Breaking Bad
 Buffy the Vampire Slayer
 Camelot
 Carnivàle
 The Carrie Diaries
 CatDog
 Cheers
 Chuck
 The Closer
 Cold Case
 Coupling (UK)
 Coupling (US)
 Cracking Up
 CSI: NY
 Chuck
 Dallas
 Danny Phantom
 Dawson's Creek
 Desperate Housewives
 Dexter
 Dharma & Greg
 Doctor Who
 Dora the Explorer
 The Ellen DeGeneres Show
 Elizabeth I
 Emma
 ER
 Everybody Loves Raymond
 The Exes
 The Fairly OddParents
 Family Guy
 Fanboy & Chum Chum
 Fat Actress
 Frasier
 Freaks and Geeks
 Game of Thrones
 Get Real
 Ghost Whisperer
 Gilmore Girls
 Gossip Girl
 The Guardian
 Hannibal
 Harsh Realm
 Hell On Wheels
 Heroes
 Hot in Cleveland
 House of Anubis
 How I Met Your Mother
 Hung
 iCarly
 Into The West
 The Jay Leno Show
 Joey
 Just Shoot Me
 Kappa Mikey
 The King of Queens
 Kitchen Confidential
 Kung Fu Panda: Legends of Awesomeness
 Las Vegas
 Law & Order
 Law & Order: Criminal Intent
 Law & Order: Special Victims Unit
 The Legend of Korra
 Leverage
 Listen Up!
 Mad About You
 Mad Men
 Major Crimes
 Malcolm in the Middle
 Married... with Children
 Masters of Horror
 Memphis Beat
 Merlin
 The Mighty B!
 Millennium
 Miss Match
 Miss Universe (encore telecasts)
 Miss World
 Mom
 Moonlight
 The Musketeers
 My Name Is Earl
 The New Adventures of Old Christine
 NewsRadio
 The Newsroom
 Nightmares And Dreamscapes
 Nip/Tuck
 NYPD Blue
 The O.C.
 One Tree Hill
 The Pacific
 Parker Lewis Can't Lose
 The Penguins of Madagascar
 Person of Interest
 Planet Sheen
 Prison Break
 The Practice
 Providence
 Pushing Daisies
 Revolution
 Rizzoli & Isles
 Rocket Power
 Rocko's Modern Life
 Roswell
 Rome
 Rugrats
 Scrubs
 Seinfeld
 Sherlock
 Significant Others
 The Simpsons
 Six Feet Under
 Smallville
 South Park
 The Sopranos
 Spartacus: Blood and Sand
 Spartacus: Gods of the Arena
 SpongeBob SquarePants
 Stacked
 The Starter Wife
 South Park
 Suburgatory
 Sullivan and Son
 Teen Wolf
 Terminator: The Sarah Connor Chronicles
 The Tonight Show with Jay Leno
 The Tonight Show Starring Jimmy Fallon
 T.U.F.F. Puppy
 Twice In A Lifetime
 Two and a Half Men
 Two Guys and a Girl
 Unnatural History
 Veronica Mars
 Victoria's Secret Fashion Show
 Vikings
 What About Joan
 Without A Trace
 The X-Files

CNBC-e Ticker 
CNBC-e used a ticker similar to CNBC Europe and this ticker was only shown throughout the business day. The ticker was continuously shown on commercial breaks, only during the business day. Normally, the ticker was three-line, except when it was a Turkish business day with no ISE session. Then, ticker was two-line. Unlike CNBC Europe, CNBC-e ticker was not sponsored, but CNBC-e business day shows and programs were.
Ticker contained as follows: (times were Turkish official standard/summer time)
Squawk Box(6:00–8:30): Upper Band: Worldwide Markets Middle Band: ISE Stocks (in alphabetical order) Lower Band: Business News separated by NBC logo
ISE Pre-Market (8:30–9:30): Upper Band: Futures, Bonds Middle Band: ISE Stocks (in alphabetical order). Lower Band: Business News separated by NBC logo
ISE Market Hours (9:30–12:30, 13:30–18:00): Upper Band: Futures, Bonds, Most Actives, Winners and Losers Middle Band: ISE Stocks (in alphabetical order). Lower Band: Business News separated by NBC logo.
ISE Lunch Break (12:30–13:30): Upper Band: Worldwide Markets Middle Band: ISE Stocks (in alphabetical order) Lower Band: Business News separated by NBC logo
The disclaimer translated into English:
All the data broadcast under the ISE trademark are subject to copyright and may not be rebroadcast or republished. ISE is a trademark of Istanbul Stock Exchange.

References

External links 
CNBC-e

 
CNBC global channels
Doğuş Group
Defunct television channels in Turkey
Television channels and stations established in 2000
Television channels and stations disestablished in 2015
2000 establishments in Turkey
2015 disestablishments in Turkey
24-hour television news channels in Turkey